Philippine Secondary Schools Basketball Championship (PSSBC) is an amateur basketball tournament participated by different high school basketball teams from the NCAA, UAAP and Filipino-Chinese leagues. PSSBC's mission is to provide an avenue for young basketball players to further hone their skills before they will advanced in the collegiate level. The PSSBC was founded in December 2012, by the Fil-Chinese owners of different brands, sanctioned by the Samahang Basketbol ng Pilipinas (SBP) and supported by Ever Bilena/Blackwater Elite, Rain or Shine, Freego, Jumbo Plastic Linoleum, MEC Networks, Hapee Toothpaste, Dickies Underwear, and Ironcon Builders.

In 2016, the PSSBC has plans for further expansion, including inviting high school teams from Luzon, Visayas and Mindanao.

On December 19, 2021, PSSBC Commissioner and long-time San Beda Red Cubs coach Edmundo "Ato" Badolato died due to heart attack. He was 74.

Teams

2019 Freego Jeans Cup
The competition this year will be among 12 teams: 4 from the UAAP, 4 from the NCAA, 3 from the Filipino-Chinese Amateur Athletic Federation (FCAAF), and 1 from ISAA.

Ateneo De Manila University 
Adamson University 
Chiang Kai Shek College
La Salle Greenhills 
Hope Christian High School
Far Eastern University-Diliman
La Consolacion College-Manila
Lyceum of the Philippines University
Nazareth School-National University 
San Beda University-Taytay
San Sebastian College-Recoletos 
Xavier School

Champions
Inaugural Cup (2012): Hope Christian High School
2nd Battle of the Champions Cup (2013) : San Sebastian College-Recoletos
3rd Ironcon Builders Cup (2014): San Beda High School
4th Jumbo Plastic Linoleum Cup (2015): Chang Kai Shek College
5th MEC Networks Cup (2016) : Adamson University
6th Dickies Underwear Cup (2017) : San Beda High School
7th Rain or Shine Cup (2018) : National University-Nazareth School
8th Freego Jeans Cup (2019) : National University-Nazareth School
(2020) : Not Held
(2021) : Not Held
(2022) : Not Held

References

Youth sport in the Philippines
Sports leagues established in 2012
2012 establishments in the Philippines